Gush Dan (lit. "Dan bloc") or Tel Aviv metropolitan area is a conurbation in Israel, located along the country's Mediterranean coastline. There is no single formal definition of Gush Dan, though the term is in frequent use by both governmental bodies and the general public. It ranges from combining Tel Aviv with cities that form urban continuum with it, to the entire areas from both the Tel Aviv and the Central District, or sometimes the whole Metropolitan Area of Tel Aviv. which includes a small part of the Southern District as well. Gush Dan is the largest conurbation and metropolitan area in Israel, with the metropolitan area having an estimated population of 4,054,570 residents, 95% of whom are Israeli Jews.

Cities in Gush Dan
Population in cities as of the end of 2018:

Over 400,000

Tel Aviv-Yafo 

Over 200,000

Rishon LeZion 
Petah Tikva 
Ashdod 
Netanya 
Bnei Brak 

Over 100,000

Holon 
Ramat Gan 
Ashkelon 
Rehovot 
Bat Yam 
Herzliya 
Kfar Saba 

Over 50,000

Modi'in-Maccabim-Re'ut 
Ramla 
Lod 
Ra'anana 
Givatayim 
Hod HaSharon 61,102
Rosh HaAyin 50,453

Over 10,000

Ness Ziona 49,108
Ramat HaSharon 46,019
El'ad 46.896
Yavne 45,453
Kiryat Ono
Yehud-Monosson
Tira
Giv'at Shmuel
Kafr Qasim
Qalansawe
Be'er Ya'akov
Even Yehuda
Gan Yavne
Ganei Tikva
Gedera
Giv'at Shmuel
Jaljulia
Kadima-Zoran
Kfar Yona
Kiryat Ekron
Kokhav Ya'ir
Mazkeret Batya
Shoham
Tel Mond

Metropolitan rings
Israel Central Bureau of Statistics divides the Tel Aviv metropolitan area into four:

History

The name Gush Dan means "Dan Bloc", and is so named because the area was the territory of the tribe of Dan in the ancient Kingdom of Israel. According to the biblical narrative, the tribe had originally tried to settle in the central coastal area of Canaan, but due to enmity with the Philistines who had already settled there, were only able to camp in the hill country overlooking the Sorek Valley. The camp location became known as Mahaneh Dan ("Camps of Dan"). The region they attempted to settle included the area as far north as Joppa and as far south as Shephelah in the area of Timnah. As a result of the pressure from the Philistines, the tribe abandoned hopes of settling near the central coast, instead migrating to the north of the country. After conquering Laish, the tribe refounded it as their capital and renamed it Dan. In remembrance of the original territory assignments, this coastal region is referred to as Gush Dan. The modern city of Tel Aviv was founded in 1909 as a suburb of the Arab majority coastal city of Jaffa.

The city grew rapidly in the ensuing decades thanks to Jewish immigration from Europe, with the population reaching 150,000 in 1934, and 230,000 14 years later when Israel gained its independence. Before the establishment of the state, other towns in the Gush Dan were founded as well, such as Petah Tikva in 1878, Rishon LeZion in 1882, Ness Ziona in 1883, Rehovot in 1890, and the majority of other Gush Dan cities were established before 1948.

In 1947, the Jewish population of the Gush Dan was nearly 400,000, comprising the majority of the Jewish population of Mandate Palestine. As such almost all of it was included in the Jewish state proposed by the 1947 United Nations Partition Plan for Palestine. After the 1948 Arab–Israeli War the Arab population of the region, which had been nearly 150,000 before the war, was reduced to around 10,000. They were quickly replaced by a larger number of Jews fleeing from postwar Europe and persecution in Arab countries.

However, at this time many new immigrants did not come to Tel Aviv. In the 1950s towns were built on the edges of the Gush Dan, including Ashdod, Rosh HaAyin and Yavne. The nation's sole port at the time was located in the northern city of Haifa and its evolving metropolitan area making that city at least as important as Tel Aviv. At the same time the new government was trying to disperse the nation's population to the periphery, discouraging settlement in the already populated Gush Dan. This slowed the growth of the Gush Dan, but the area still more than doubled in population within 20 years of the establishment of the state. The opening of the Port of Ashdod in the southern Gush Dan also increased the area's importance, with Haifa's importance diminishing, and Tel Aviv's increasing due to its proximity to the Port of Ashdod. Tel Aviv itself witnessed population decreases in the 1970s and 1980s with outer regions of the Gush Dan with lower costs of living absorbing many people who had left Tel Aviv.

Only in the 1990s with the immigration of more than 1 million Jews from former Soviet Republics, 40,000 Ethiopian Jews, and many others to Israel, as well as a boom in the religious population, did Tel Aviv begin to grow again. The demand for housing increased dramatically, with new cities such as Modiin, El'ad being built, and cities like Ashdod more than doubling in population, from 83,000 in 1990, to 175,000 in 2000. In the 2000s the area continued to grow, attracting many immigrants from the Haifa metropolitan area. With a population of 4,052,200 people as of 2019, Gush Dan is home to the commercial, economical, cultural, and industrial center of Israel. Despite some successes in ongoing attempts by the Israeli government to encourage migration to the Galilee and the Negev, Gush Dan retains its position as the heart of the State of Israel.

Economy
The Gush Dan is the economic center of the state of Israel. It is responsible for a large proportion of the nation's economy and contains numerous commercial centers.

Major business and commercial districts

Diamond Exchange District – Ramat Gan – The Diamond Exchange District is in the city of Ramat Gan. Bordering the Ayalon Highway, the road dividing Ramat Gan and Tel Aviv, the district is home to Israel's diamond industry as well as being a major commercial center. The Diamond Exchange itself contains four buildings (towers) connected by bridges; the Maccabi Tower, Shimshon Tower, Noam Tower, and Diamond Tower which contains the world's largest diamond trading floor and is the head-building of the Diamond Exchange. Also in the district are a number of other buildings of importance. The Moshe Aviv Tower is Israel's tallest building at 244 meters. Opposite, the Elite Tower is currently under construction, set to be equal or greater in height. The Sheraton City Tower is a hotel in the district, whilst other notable buildings are the Ayalon Tower and Gibor Sport House.
Dizengoff Square – Tel Aviv – Dizengoff Center is a shopping mall in central Tel Aviv, host to about 140,000 visitors weekly. Lying south of Dizengoff Square, it is named for Meir Dizengoff, the first mayor of Tel Aviv. The first mall in Tel Aviv, the center opened in 1983. It is divided into two parts and straddles both sides of Dizengoff Street with the two parts linked by a pair of skywalks. The mall is bordered by Dizengoff Street, King George Street and the smaller Tchernichovsky street.
Port of Ashdod – Ashdod – The Port of Ashdod is one of Israel's two main cargo ports. The port is located in Ashdod, about 40 kilometers south of Tel Aviv, adjoining the mouth of the Lachish River. Its establishment doubled the country's port capacity.
Rothschild Boulevard – Tel Aviv – Rothschild Boulevard (Sderot Rothschild) is a street in Tel Aviv beginning in Neve Tzedek at its southwestern edge and running north to Habima Theatre. It is one of the busiest and most expensive streets in the Gush Dan, being one of the city's main tourist attractions.
Azrieli Center – Tel Aviv – Azrieli Center is a complex of skyscrapers in Tel Aviv. At the base of the center lies a large shopping mall. The center was originally designed by Israeli-American architect Eli Attia, and after he fell out with the developer of the center David Azrieli (after whom it is named), completion of the design was passed on to the Tel Aviv firm of Moore Yaski Sivan Architects.
Tel Aviv Stock Exchange – Tel Aviv – The Tel Aviv Stock Exchange (TASE; ; colloquially known as the Boursa) is Israel's only stock exchange. The TASE is the only public market for trading securities in Israel. It plays a major role in the Israeli economy. TASE lists some 622 companies, about 60 of which are also listed on stock exchanges in other countries. TASE also lists some 180 exchange-traded funds (ETFs), 60 government bonds, 500 corporate bonds, and more than 1000 mutual funds. There are 29 members that make up TASE. The list of members indicates that one of the members is a candidate.
Tel Aviv Promenade – Tel Aviv – The Tel Aviv promenade is running along its beaches, and is an integral part of the city's lifestyle, as well as a major tourist attraction. Most of the city's bathing beaches and hiking paths are concentrated in the central part of its 14 kilometers of Mediterranean shore. It contains numerous hotels, and commercial buildings.
Kiryat Atidim – Tel Aviv – high tech center in eastern Ramat HaHayal. The district is known for its ultra modern architecture.
Bat Yam coastal strip – Bat Yam - southward extension of the Tel Aviv Promenade
Herzliya Pituah coastal strip and industrial area – Herzliya – northward extension of the Tel Aviv Promenade
Kiryat Aryeh, Kiryat Matalon, and Segula Industrial Zones – (These three form the second largest industrial zone in the country after Haifa) – Petah Tikva
Ben Gurion Airport Industrial Zone – Lod
Eastern Industrial Sector – Holon
Eastern Industrial Zones – Netanya
Poleg industrial area – Netanya

Institutes of higher education

Universities
Tel Aviv University (TAU) (Tel Aviv) – 30,000 students
Bar-Ilan University (BIU) (Ramat Gan) – 27,000 students
Open University of Israel (OPENU) (Ra'anana) – 40,000 students
Weizmann Institute of Science (WIS) (Rehovot) – 700 students
Hebrew University of Jerusalem – Based in Jerusalem - maintains a campus in Rehovot which includes The Faculty of Agriculture and the School of Veterinary Medicine.

Colleges
Academic Center of Law and Business, Ramat Gan
Academic College of Tel Aviv–Yafo, Tel Aviv
Bezalel Academy of Art and Design
College of Management (COLMAN), Rishon LeZion
Holon Institute of Technology
Interdisciplinary Center (IDC), Herzliya
Jerusalem College of Technology
Netanya Academic College
Netanya Academic College of Law
Ono Academic College
The Center for Academic Studies in Or Yehuda
Shenkar College of Engineering and Design
College of Technology Education, Tel Aviv
Kibbutzim College of Education, Tel Aviv
Levinsky College of Education, Tel Aviv
Mofet, Consortium of Colleges of Education
Moreshet Yaakov Religious College of Education, Rehovot
Ort College for Teachers of Technology, Tel Aviv
Talpiot College of Education, Tel Aviv

Shopping centers

Tel Aviv
Carmel Market
Ramat Aviv Mall
Azrieli Center
Dizengoff Center
Tel Aviv Central Bus Station
Opera Tower
London Ministores Mall

Transportation

The Dan Bus Company is primarily focused on serving the Gush Dan, although it is being replaced by the Kavim company in many of the Gush Dan's cities. Much of Israel's national highway network feeds into the area, such as Highway 1, Highway 2, Highway 4, and Highway 5.  Gush Dan is also served by the local Ayalon Highway. Israel Railways, the state owned, national rail network provider, also feeds most traffic into or within the Gush Dan region. The Tel Aviv Light Rail, currently under construction, will also be a major feature in the regions future transport, as will the high speed service to Jerusalem. Two airports are located in the Gush Dan; Sde Dov Airport which closed at 2019, and Ben Gurion International Airport in Lod which is Israel's largest airport handles over 22 million passengers a year and offers flights to destinations in Europe, Africa, Asia, and The Americas.

Major highways
Some of the major freeways/expressways carrying commuter traffic in and out of the Tel Aviv Metropolitan Area are:

Highway 20 (also called Ayalon Freeway) – a major intracity freeway in Gush Dan, which runs along Tel Aviv's center eastern border from north to south.
Highway 1 – connects Tel Aviv with Jerusalem.
Highway 2 (also called The Coastal Highway) – stretches from Tel Aviv to Haifa. It is one of the busiest highways in Israel.
Highway 4 (also called Geha Highway, or First President Road) – a major north–south highway connecting Ra'anana and Kfar Saba in the North to Petah Tiqva and Ramat Gan in the center and Ashdod in the South.
Highway 5 – connects the Mediterranean coast immediately north of Tel Aviv with the central Sharon plain and Ariel and other Israeli settlements in the northern West Bank.
Highway 44 – connects Tel Aviv with Ramla, Lod and the Shefela.
Highway 6 – a new north–south tollway running east of Gush Dan from Galilee in the north to Beer Sheva in the south.

Panoramas

See also
List of cities in Israel

References

External links

 Tel Aviv metropolitan area definition

Regions of Israel
Hebrew Bible places
Metropolitan areas of Israel
Geography of Tel Aviv
Geography of Tel Aviv District
Geography of Central District (Israel)